Sikanni Chief is an unincorporated locality in the Northern Rocky Mountains of British Columbia, Canada. Highway 97 / Alaska Highway runs through this place.

See also

Sekani

References

Unincorporated settlements in British Columbia
Peace River Country
Populated places in the Peace River Regional District